Charles Luce-Varlet (born Douai 1 December 1781 - 1853) was a French composer and violinist. His noted compositions include a violin concerto, and a comic opera on the youth of Haydn.

Selected recordings
aria from L'élève de Presbourg : "De ses illusions… Viens, ô mélodie" (Haydn). Cyrille Dubois Orchestre National de Lille Pierre Dumoussaud Alpha 2023

References

1781 births
1853 deaths